Flagstaff Lake may refer to the following lakes in the United States:

 Flagstaff Lake (Maine)
 Flagstaff Lake (Oregon)
 Lake Flagstaff, Western Australia